The 2018 Monterrey Challenger was a professional tennis tournament played on hard courts. It was the ninth edition of the tournament which was part of the 2018 ATP Challenger Tour. It took place in Monterrey, Mexico from 1 to 7 October 2018.

Singles main-draw entrants

Seeds

 1 Rankings are as of 24 September 2018.

Other entrants
The following players received wildcards into the singles main draw:
  Víctor Estrella Burgos
  Lucas Gómez
  Gerardo López Villaseñor
  Jürgen Melzer

The following player received entry into the singles main draw using a protected ranking:
  Santiago Giraldo

The following players received entry from the qualifying draw:
  Harrison Adams
  Gonzalo Escobar
  Pavel Krainik
  Zsombor Piros

The following player received entry as a lucky loser:
  Sekou Bangoura

Champions

Singles

  David Ferrer def.  Ivo Karlović 6–3, 6–4.

Doubles

  Marcelo Arévalo /  Jeevan Nedunchezhiyan def.  Leander Paes /  Miguel Ángel Reyes-Varela 6–1, 6–4.

References

2018 in Mexican sports
2018 ATP Challenger Tour